Tamazula may refer to several locations in Mexico:
Tamazula de Victoria, in the state of Durango
Tamazula de Gordiano, in the state of Jalisco
Tamazula a village in the municipio of Guasave, Sinaloa
Or to a mountain:
Or to a river:
Tamazula River, which drains a portion of Sinaloa and Durango

The name can also refer to Tamazula hot sauce manufactured by Salsa Tamazula of Guadalajara, Jalisco.